The Sipsey River is a  swampy low-lying river in west central Alabama. The Sipsey is surrounded by wetland habitat. It originates near Glen Allen, and discharges into the Tombigbee River near Vienna. The river belongs to the Southeastern Coastal Plain and features an eastern deciduous forest terrestrial biome. Sipsey is a name derived from the Choctaw language meaning "poplar tree".

See also
 List of rivers of Alabama

References

Rivers of Alabama
Tributaries of the Tombigbee River
Rivers of Pickens County, Alabama
Alabama placenames of Native American origin